The Cadillac V-Series.R, originally named the Cadillac V-LMDh, is a sports prototype racing car designed by Cadillac and built by Dallara. It is designed to the Le Mans Daytona h regulations, and will debut in the IMSA SportsCar Championship at the season opening 24 Hours of Daytona. The car will also contest the FIA World Endurance Championship from 2023 onwards. The engine's 5.5L displacement is the largest displacement of any of the GTP cars debuted in the revival of the GTP class at the 2023 24 Hours of Daytona.

Racing results

Complete IMSA SportsCar Championship results
(key) Races in bold indicates pole position. Races in italics indicates fastest lap.

* Season still in progress.

Complete World Endurance Championship results
(key) Races in bold indicates pole position. Races in italics indicates fastest lap.

* Season still in progress.

References

Dallara racing cars
V-LMDh
IMSA GTP cars
Hybrid electric cars
Sports prototypes
Le Mans Daytona h cars
Cars introduced in 2022